Stefan Sagmeister (born August 6, 1962) is an Austrian graphic designer, storyteller, and typographer based in New York City. In 1993, Sagmeister founded his company, Sagmeister Inc., to create designs for the music industry. He has designed album covers for Lou Reed, OK Go, The Rolling Stones, David Byrne, Jay Z, Aerosmith, Talking Heads, Brian Eno and Pat Metheny. From 2011 until 2019 he partnered with Jessica Walsh under the name Sagmeister & Walsh Inc.

Early life and education
He began his design career at the age of 15 at "Alphorn", an Austrian Youth magazine, which is named after the traditional Alpine musical instrument. Sagmeister studied graphic design at the Hochschule fuer Angewandte Kunst, Vienna, graduating in 1986. He later won a Fulbright scholarship to study at the Pratt Institute in New York, where he received a Master of Fine Arts degree.

Design career
In 1991, worked with Leo Burnett's Hong Kong Design Group. In 1993, he returned to New York to work with Tibor Kalman's M&Co design company.
In 1993, he set up his company Sagmeister Inc in New York. He has since designed branding, graphics, and packaging for clients as diverse as the Rolling Stones, HBO, the Guggenheim Museum and Time Warner.
He is the author of the design monograph "Made You Look" which was published by Booth-Clibborn editions.
He teaches in the graduate design department of the School of Visual Arts in New York and has been appointed as the Frank Stanton Chair at the Cooper Union School of Art, New York.

Controversy 
Sagmeister became the subject of controversy after his performance of a lewd joke about animal fellatio at the annual web conference Webstock in Wellington, New Zealand, in February 2017, embarrassing a sign language interpreter and upsetting some in the audience. The organizers apologized to the interpreter in person, and to attendees following the incident, and on Twitter. Webstock organizers also followed this apology up with a longer statement on their blog.
The joke, according to Fast Company, involved having a sign language interpreter assigned to his talk "interpret a story about a manatee giving itself a blowjob", with repeated requirements to the interpreter to use gestures to indicate the sex act. 
Sagmeister later apologized through the Sagmeister & Walsh Twitter account, and from his personal Instagram account.

Awards 
Sagmeister received a Grammy Award in 2005 in the Best Boxed or Special Limited Edition Package category for art directing Once in a Lifetime box set by Talking Heads. He received a second Grammy Award for his design of the David Byrne and Brian Eno album Everything That Happens Will Happen Today in the Grammy Award for Best Recording Package category on January 31, 2010.

In 2005, Sagmeister won the National Design Award for Communications from the Cooper-Hewitt National Design Museum. In 2013 Sagmeister was awarded the Golden Medal of Honor of the Republic of Austria.

In 2018 he was voted  Austrian of the Year by the Austrian newspaper Die Presse.

Exhibitions
2000 Design Biannual, Cooper-Hewitt National Design Museum, New York

2001 Stealing Eyeballs, Kunstlerhaus, Vienna; Solo exhibition, Gallery Frédéric Sanchez, Paris

2002 Solo exhibition, Museum of Applied Arts, Vienna
2003 Solo exhibition, Museum fur Gestaltung, Zurich, Switzerland; Solo exhibition, DDD Gallery Tokyo

2012 The Happy Show, Institute of Contemporary Art, Philadelphia

2013 The Happy Show, Design Exchange, Toronto

2013 The Happy Show. MOCA, at Pacific Design Center, Los Angeles

2013 Jewish Museum, New York

2013 The Happy Show, Chicago Cultural Center

2013 The Happy Show, Paris, Gaite Lyrique

2015 The Happy Show, Museum of Applied Arts, Vienna

2015 The Happy Show, The Museum of Vancouver, Vancouver, Canada

2015 The Happy Show, Museum für angewandte Kunst Frankfurt

2018/2019 Sagmeister & Walsh: Beauty, Museum of Applied Arts, Vienna

2019 Sagmeister & Walsh: Beauty, Mak Frankfurt

2019 Sagmeister & Walsh: Beauty Museum für Kunst und Gewerbe Hamburg

2021 Sagmeister & Walsh: Beauty Fondation d’entreprise Martell

2021 Beautiful Numbers, Thomas Erben Gallery

2022 Sagmeister & Walsh: Beauty Vorarlberg Museum, Bregenz, Austria

Filmography 
 The Happy Film (2016, documentary)

Further reading
Sagmeister, Stefan: Made You Look - Peter Hall (Booth-Clibborn, 2001) ; also Abrams paperback edition (2009): 
Sagmeister, Stefan; Things I have learned in my life so far (2008) New York:Abrams, 
Sagmeister Stefan, Another Book About Promotion & Sales Material, New York, Abrams 2011, 
Sagmeister & Walsh, Beauty, Phaidon Press; 2018,

See also
:Category:Albums with cover art by Stefan Sagmeister

References

External links 
Official website
London Design Museum's entry for Sagmeister

1962 births
Living people
People from Bregenz
Austrian graphic designers
Austrian typographers and type designers
Grammy Award winners
Austrian expatriates in the United States
Austrian poster artists
National Design Award winners
Album-cover and concert-poster artists
University of Applied Arts Vienna alumni
AIGA medalists
Fulbright alumni